Omoglymmius lineatus is a species of beetle in the subfamily Rhysodidae. It was described by Grouvelle in 1908.

References

lineatus
Beetles described in 1908